Achagiotika Nea (meaning Achaean News) was a newspaper that covered its top stories in Kato Achaia and the northwestern Achaia prefecture. It was first published in January 1990 and ceased operations in October 2020.

Information
Achagiotika Nea features sports, weather, businesses and entertainment. It features pages about news stories.

References

See also
List of newspapers in Greece

Dymi, Achaea
Greek-language newspapers
Mass media in Western Greece
Publications established in 1990
1990 establishments in Greece
Weekly newspapers published in Greece